Under the Sign of Hell is the third studio album by Norwegian black metal band Gorgoroth. Recorded in 1996 and released in 1997, it was the first album to feature Ares on bass (on one track) and the only one to feature Grim on drums.

Release
Under the Sign of Hell was released on 20 October 1997 on Malicious Records. It was re-released in 1999 on Century Black, and again in 2005 on Season of Mist. Agonia Records released the album on LP in 2005, limited to 1000 copies, and Back on Black Records reissued the LP again in 2006. A remastered version was released in 2007 by Regain Records.

Gorgoroth re-recorded the album as Under the Sign of Hell 2011, released in November 2011 by Regain Records. This re-recorded version was the last album with vocalist Pest.

Track listing

Personnel

Gorgoroth
Pest – vocals
Infernus – guitar; bass on all tracks except "Revelation of Doom" (original release)
Grim – drums

Additional Personnel
Ares – bass on "Revelation of Doom" (original release)
Pytten – production
Tomas Asklund – drums (Under the Sign of Hell 2011)

References

Gorgoroth albums
1997 albums
Season of Mist albums